Brunel Bridge could be an informal or local reference to any one of several famous bridges in England built by Isambard Kingdom Brunel, including: 

The Clifton Suspension Bridge across the Avon Gorge in Bristol
The Royal Albert Bridge across the River Tamar from Devon to Cornwall
Maidenhead Railway Bridge across the River Thames in Maidenhead

or:
 The proposed pedestrian and cycle bridge over the River Thames between Rotherhithe and Canary Wharf

Other
The Brunel Bridge Roundabout in Slough, famous by its appearance in the opening titles of the Ricky Gervais sitcom The Office